Islamia High School, Olhanpur is a school in the Saran district in Bihar, India. It is one of the oldest schools in Bihar. It was established in 1937. Islamia High School is a coeducational school. It is a senior secondary school (classes 9 to 12).

The school was established by Late Maulana Shah Mohammad Wasim Quadri.The renowled scholar of Urdu, Persian and Arabic.

This school is now under the Bihar Government and the Bihar School Examination Board.

It has a good playground for various sports event and there are 2 departments: primary and high school.

High schools and secondary schools in Bihar
Saran district
1937 establishments in India
Educational institutions established in 1937